Bulinus nyassanus is a species of small air-breathing freshwater snail with a sinistral shell, an aquatic pulmonate gastropod mollusk in the family Planorbidae, the ramshorn snails and their allies. This species is endemic to Lake Malawi in Africa, where found both in shallow and relatively deep water.

Although only a minority of these snails are infected (generally 2% or less in B. nyassanus), they do play an important role in the spread of bilharzia (schistosomiasis), a parasite that causes "snail fewer" in humans. The snail-eating cichlid fish Trematocranus placodon has a preference for B. nyassanus.

References

Invertebrates of Malawi
Freshwater snails of Africa
Bulinus
Gastropods described in 1877
Taxonomy articles created by Polbot
Fauna of Lake Malawi